
Gmina Wąpielsk is a rural gmina (administrative district) in Rypin County, Kuyavian-Pomeranian Voivodeship, in north-central Poland.

Villages
Gmina Wąpielsk contains the villages and settlements of Bielawki, Długie, Kiełpiny, Kierz Półwieski, Kupno, Lamkowizna, Łapinóż-Rumunki, Łapinóżek, Półwiesk Duży, Półwiesk Mały, Radziki Duże, Radziki Małe, Ruszkowo, Tomkowo and Wąpielsk.

Neighbouring gminas
Gmina Wąpielsk is bordered by the gminas of Bobrowo, Brodnica, Brzuze, Golub-Dobrzyń, Osiek, Radomin and Rypin.

References
Polish official population figures 2006

Wapielsk
Rypin County